Otter Creek is a stream in Sauk County, Wisconsin, in the United States.

Otter Creek was named after the otters seen there by early settlers.

See also
List of rivers of Wisconsin

References

Rivers of Sauk County, Wisconsin
Rivers of Wisconsin